The 1962 Michigan Auditor General election was held on November 6, 1962. Incumbent Democrat Billie S. Farnum defeated Republican nominee L. William Seidman who got 50.32% of the vote. 

This was the last Michigan Auditor General election, because with the ratification of the 1963 Michigan Constitution, the State Auditor General became an appointed position, rather than an elected one.

General election

Candidates
Major party candidates
Billie S. Farnum, Democratic
L. William Seidman, Republican

Other candidates
Albert Mills, Socialist Labor

Results

References

Auditor General
November 1962 events in the United States
Michigan
Michigan Auditor General elections